Lemon Tree Hotels is an Indian hotel chain. It owns and operates 84 hotels with a total of 8300 rooms in 52 cities across India.

According to the Horwath Report, Lemmon Tree Hotels is India's largest hotel chain in the mid-priced hotel sector and the 3rd largest overall in terms of controlling interest in owned and leased rooms as of 30 June 2017, .

History
Lemon Tree Hotels was founded in 2002 by Patu Keswani. It opened its first hotel with 49 rooms in May 2004.

In 2019, the company acquired Berggruen Hotels Private Limited for an enterprise value of  605 crores. At the time of acquisition, Berggruen Hotels owned 936 rooms and managed 975 rooms under the "Keys" brand in 21 cities across India.

Lemon Tree Hotels went public and was listed on the National Stock Exchange of India on 9 April 2018.

Operations

The company operates under 7 brands, namely Aurika Hotels and Resorts, Lemon Tree Premier, Lemon Tree Hotels, Red Fox by Lemon Tree Hotels, Keys Prima, Keys Select, and Keys Lite.

Corporate social responsibility
Currently, about 20% of group employees are from deprived and disabled segments of the population.

All Lemon Tree Hotels adopt a stray dog from that area and make it a mascot. Stray dogs are groomed and given specific duties in the hotels. It is the largest corporate adopter of stray dogs in India.

References

Hotel chains in India
Companies based in Delhi
Hotels established in 2002
2002 establishments in Delhi